Chandler's Ford railway station serves the Chandler's Ford area of Eastleigh in Hampshire, England.

History
The station was opened as a halt by the London and South Western Railway in 1847.  Passenger services were withdrawn by British Rail in May 1969, although occasional diverted trains and railtours continued to use the line, passing through the station without calling.

A £10 million pound plan was put forward in 1999 to reopen Southampton Terminus and Northam Station, which was to have been controlled by Anglia Railways, their plans included building a new rail-link using the current remaining track by St. Marys Stadium and as far as the Waterfront, which is now safe guarded by Southampton City Council for future rail links.  This would have allowed trains to go from Southampton Waterfront to East Anglia without the need to change at London. It was also hoped it would reduce the traffic around Southampton with a local commuter line linking the Waterfront to Romsey, Halterworth and Chandler's Ford. The plans were thwarted after South West Trains changed their 1999 time table, which resulted in two of Southampton Central's four tracks being blocked for about 20 minutes of each hour, resulting in capacity issues.

Chandler's Ford was reopened for passenger traffic on 18 May 2003, though the new station building was not completed until later that year. It was officially opened on 19 October 2003 by the television gardening presenter Charlie Dimmock, who lives in the area. The original station had two platforms, but the new station has only one, as the line is now single-track only.

Services

Connections
Chandler’s Ford station is also served by buses on the Bluestar 1 between Southampton and Winchester via Bassett and Compton.

References

External links
Local Rail Information

Railway stations in Hampshire
DfT Category E stations
Former London and South Western Railway stations
Railway stations in Great Britain opened in 1847
Railway stations in Great Britain closed in 1969
Railway stations in Great Britain opened in 2003
Reopened railway stations in Great Britain
Railway stations served by South Western Railway
Beeching closures in England
1847 establishments in England